The Man from Bitter Roots is a lost 1916 American silent Western film directed by Oscar Apfel and starring William Farnum. It was produced and released by the Fox Film Corporation.

Cast 
 William Farnum - Bruce Burt
 Slim Whitaker - 'Slim' Naudain 
 Henry A. Barrows - T. Victor Sprudell 
 Willard Louis - J. Winfield Harrah
 William Burress - Toy
 Harry De Vere 
 Betty Schade
 Betty Harte

References

External links 
 
 
  lobby poster

1916 films
1916 Western (genre) films
Lost Western (genre) films
Films directed by Oscar Apfel
Fox Film films
Lost American films
American black-and-white films
1916 lost films
Silent American Western (genre) films
1910s American films
1910s English-language films